Bytowa is a river of Poland, a tributary of the Słupia. It flows through Bytów.

1Bytowa
Rivers of Poland
Rivers of Pomeranian Voivodeship